The Peter Henrici Prize is a prize awarded jointly by ETH Zurich and the Society for Industrial and Applied Mathematics (SIAM) for "original contributions to applied analysis and numerical analysis and/or for exposition appropriate for applied mathematics and scientific computing". The prize is named in honor of the Swiss numerical analyst Peter Henrici, who was a professor at ETH Zurich for 25 years.

Description
The prize, initiated in 1999 with funds contributed by ETH Zurich, is awarded every four years. It consists of a certificate containing the citation and (as of 2023) a cash prize of $5,000 (US). The winner is chosen by a prize committee, consisting of four members, two members chosen by SIAM and two others by ETH Zurich. "The prize may be awarded to any member of the scientific community who meets the general guideline of the prize description."

Award ceremony
The award is presented every four years at the International Congress on Industrial and Applied Mathematics (ICIAM). The presentation of the prize is made by the SIAM president. The recipient is requested to give a lecture at the conference.

Prize winners
 1999 : Germund Dahlquist
 2003 : Ernst Hairer and Gerhard Wanner
 2007 : Gilbert Strang
 2011 : Bjorn Engquist
 2015 : Eitan Tadmor
 2019 : Weinan E

References

Awards established in 1991
Awards of the Society for Industrial and Applied Mathematics